Euterpe precatoria is a tall, slender-stemmed, pinnate-leaved palm native to Central and South America and Trinidad and Tobago. E. precatoria is used commercially to produce fruits, although Euterpe oleracea is more commonly cultivated due to its larger fruits.

Biological description
Stems are usually solitary (occasionally clustered), 3–20 metres tall and 4–23 centimetres in diameter. It is also estimated to be the most common tree in the Amazonian region, though it accounts for just over 1% of all trees there (5 billion out of 390 billion).

Uses
E. precatoria is a non-timber forest product that produces acai berries. As well as the edible fruits, this palm is a source of prized (though not very nutritious) hearts of palm. Since it is a single-stemmed palm, harvesting palm hearts kills the tree, and has led to a reduction in numbers. During the 1990s, the palm was heavily harvested for palmito in Peru and Bolivia, but production dropped in the early 2000s due to overharvesting. Today, prices in Peru are currently high since it is now uncommon in the wild.

Varieties
Two varieties are recognised: E. precatoria var. precatoria which has tall, solitary stems and is found in Trinidad and throughout most of the South American portion of the range, and E. precatoria var. longivaginata (Mart.) A.J.Hend. which has shorter, solitary or clustered stems, and is found in Colombia and Central America.

Etymology
Common names include mountain cabbage in Belize, açai, açaizeiro, açaí-do-amazonas or açaí-solitário in Brazil, asaí and palmiche in Colombia, wassaï in French Guiana, huasaí in Peru and manaca in Venezuela.  The stems are used for construction, a beverage is made from the fruit, and the roots are used medicinally.

Synonymy
Synonyms:
E. precatoria var. precatoria
Heterotypic synonyms
 Euterpe oleracea Engel, nom. illeg.
 Euterpe mollissima Spruce, nom. illeg.
 Euterpe jatapuensis Barb.Rodr.
 Euterpe stenophylla Trail ex Burret
 Euterpe langloisii Burret
 Euterpe petiolata Burret
 Euterpe subruminata Burret
 Euterpe confertiflora L.H.Bailey

E. precatoria var. longivaginata
Homotypic synonyms
 Euterpe longivaginata Mart.

Heterotypic synonyms
 Euterpe macrospadix Oerst.
 Euterpe karsteniana Engel
 Euterpe leucospadix H.Wendl. ex Hemsl.
 Plectis oweniana O.F.Cook
 Euterpe kalbreyeri Burret
 Euterpe microcarpa Burret
 Euterpe panamensis Burret
 Rooseveltia frankliniana O.F.Cook
 Euterpe rhodoxyla Dugand

References

precatoria
Medicinal plants of Central America
Medicinal plants of South America
Trees of Trinidad and Tobago
Trees of Central America
Trees of South America
Palms of French Guiana
Franklin D. Roosevelt
Açaí